Variety is the tenth album by Family Fodder and was released by London indie label The state51 Conspiracy in July 2013.

Track listing

References

2013 albums
Family Fodder albums